Morven is a historic home located near Simeon, Albemarle County, Virginia. It was built about 1821, and consists of a two-story, five bay by two bay, brick main block with a two-story, three bay brick wing.  The front facade features a one-bay porch with a pedimented gable roof and Tuscan order entablature, supported by four Tuscan columns. Also on the property are the contributing office and frame smokehouse.

It was added to the National Register of Historic Places in 1973.

References

External links
Morven Farm, Outbuildings, Off of Route 20, Simeon, Albemarle County, VA: 9 measured drawings and 7 data pages at Historic American Buildings Survey

Houses on the National Register of Historic Places in Virginia
Houses completed in 1821
Houses in Albemarle County, Virginia
National Register of Historic Places in Albemarle County, Virginia
Historic American Buildings Survey in Virginia